Jean-Baptiste Gramaye (Antwerp, 1579 - Lübeck, 1635) was an early modern historian of the Southern Netherlands.
He studied law and became a professor at Leuven University. Later he was employed as court historian by Albert VII, Archduke of Austria. For five months in 1619 he was a prisoner in Barbary, an experience that changed the focus of his scholarship from the Low Countries to Africa.

Works
Andromede Belgica dicta Alberto Austriaco, Isabellae Clarae Eugeniae acta a Falconis alumnis, tertio ab inauguratis principibus die (Leuven, Laurence Kellam, 1600)
Asia, sive historia universalis Asiaticarum gentium et rerum domi forisque gestarum (Brussels, Widow and Heirs of Joannes Bellerus, 1604) Available on Google Books
Gallo-Brabantia (Brussels, Jan Mommaert, 1606) Available on Google Books
Bruxella cum suo comitatu (Brussels, Jan Mommaert, 1606) Available on Google Books
Thenae et Brabantia ultra velpam quae olim Hasbaniae pars (Brussels, Jan Mommaert, 1606) Available on Google Books
Arscotum Ducatus cum suis Baronatibus (Brussels, Jan Mommaert, 1606) Available on Google Books
Historia Brabantica (Leuven, Joannes Masius, 1607) Available on Google Books
Antverpiae antiquitates (Brussels, Jan Mommaert, 1610) Available on Google Books
Antiquitates illustrissimi ducatus Brabantiae (Brussels, Jan Mommaert, 1610) Available on Google Books
Taxandria (Brussels, Rutger Velpius, 1610) Available on Google Books
Flandria Franca (Lille, Christophe Beys, 1612) Available on Google Books
Rerum Duacensium Libri Tres (Douai, Jan Bogard; Antwerp, Hieronymus Verdussen; etc., 1618) Available on Google Books
Africae illustratae libri decem (Tournai, Adrien Quinque, 1622) Available on Google Books
Respublica Namurcensis, Hannoniae et Lutsenburgensis (Amsterdam, Jan Janssens, 1634) Available on Google Books
Antiquitates belgicae, published posthumously, 1708.

References

1579 births
1635 deaths
Flemish historians
Old University of Leuven alumni
Academic staff of the Old University of Leuven
Writers from Antwerp